Heimir Guðjónsson may refer to:

 Heimir Guðjónsson (footballer, born 1937), Icelandic football player
 Heimir Guðjónsson (footballer, born 1969), Icelandic football player and coach